Jannes Van Hecke (born 15 January 2002) is a Belgian footballer who plays for Mechelen.

Club career
On 20 April 2021, he signed a three-year contract with Mechelen.

References

External links

2002 births
Living people
Belgian footballers
Belgium youth international footballers
Association football midfielders
S.V. Zulte Waregem players
K.V. Mechelen players
Belgian Pro League players